Zuhal Demir (born 2 March 1980 in Genk) is a Belgian lawyer and politician affiliated to the N-VA. Demir was elected as a member of the Belgian Chamber of Representatives in 2010. She is currently the Flemish minister for Justice and Enforcement, Environment, Energy and Tourism. Previously she served as Secretary of State for Poverty Reduction in the Belgian Government (2017-2018).

She is the daughter of Alevi Kurdish parents from Turkey and lives in Antwerp. She studied law at the Katholieke Universiteit Leuven in 1998–2003, and went on in 2003–2004 with a Master in Social Law at the Vrije Universiteit Brussel. Since 2004, she has worked as a lawyer for an international law firm.

From January 2013 until the end of 2015, she was the mayor of the district of Antwerp. In early 2016, she moved to Genk.

In February 2017, she succeeded Elke Sleurs as Secretary of State for Poverty Reduction, Equal Opportunities, People with Disabilities, Urban Policy and Scientific Policy. She has also chaired the Flemish government's integration strategy.

Demir has been given the nickname 'Iron Lady', partly because demir is the Turkish word for iron, and partly due to her advocacy for limiting the duration of unemployment benefits to encourage people back to work.

In 2017, she was accused by the Turkish press of supporting terrorism and of being a member of the banned Kurdistan Workers' Party (PKK).

Demir has received death threats as a result of her opposition to Turkey's treatment of its Kurdish population. In 2017 a man was sentenced to 6 months in prison for making threats against her. On 6 December 2018, the correctional court of Hasselt sentenced a man from Beringen with a fine of 400 Euros for threatening Zuhal Demir on Facebook. In May 2019, campaign posters for Demir in Maasmechelen were daubed with graffiti of swastikas and the logo of the extreme-right Turkish nationalist Grey Wolves organization. Demir responded that she would not be "intimidated" by the stunt. In November 2020, Demir received death and rape threats via email after she wrote a Facebook post criticising Diyanet (Directorate of Religious Affairs) funding and training of imams in mosques in Belgium. Demir described the Turkish Diyanet directorate as "Erdogan's long arm" and "the antennae of the Erdogan regime." Similar threats were also given to Flemish Vlaams Belang politician Chris Janssens. Demir was subsequently given police protection and surveillance at her home.

Notes

External link

Living people
1980 births
Members of the Chamber of Representatives (Belgium)
New Flemish Alliance politicians
Belgian women lawyers
Belgian people of Kurdish descent
People from Genk
Kurdish Alevis
21st-century Belgian lawyers
Belgian Muslims
21st-century Belgian politicians
21st-century Belgian women politicians
Belgian deputies of the 55th legislature